Zoggendorf is a constituent community of Heiligenstadt in Oberfranken in the state of Bavaria, Germany. It has a population of 110 inhabitants.

Location 
Zoggendorf is located in Bavaria, Germany.

History 
The first certification comes from 1163. The first ensured certification  was 1371. During the 1 January 1971 Zoggendorf was established in the market of Heiligenstadt.

Older descriptions

Topographic description (1752) 

"Zuschendorf, a small village of 16 households at the Leinleiter between Burggrub and Heiligenstadt, the Baron Stauffenberg therein v to Burggrub village Lord, the Bishopric is the Office Ebermannstadt from high court, Mr.."
"From dasigen subjects 2 man belonging to the Bishopric of the box office Ebermannstadt, 4 man the Princely House of Brandenburg-Culmbach, Office Streitberg, 2 man the Count v Giech into the castle Wiesentfels and 8 man the Lord Baron v. Stauffenberg shut Burggrub which stand 10 when the latter knight Canton Gebürg. "{
  "type": "FeatureCollection",
  "features": [
    {
      "type": "Feature",
      "properties": {},
      "geometry": {
        "type": "Point",
        "coordinates": [
            11.153666574901,
            49.86963030380
        ]
      }
    }
  ]
}
"The community has a piece of fish anhydrous, is committed to the Protestant religion and pfarrt to Heiligenstadt. Ehehin belonged this Zochendorf the Lord v Streitberg, after their death, there has been only smashed so "

Name 
The village was probably named by the first villager, then in the 19th century the writing and pronunciation changed the name to Zoggendorf.

Books 
 Dieter Zöberlein: Gemeindechronik Markt Heiligenstadt i. OFr. - Herausgegeben anläßlich der Feier des 450-jährigen Jubiläums der Verleihung des Marktrechtes an Heiligenstadt i. OFr. – Heiligenstadt: 1995.

External links

References 

Bamberg (district)
Municipalities in Bavaria